The Federal Assembly, also known as the Swiss parliament, is Switzerland's federal legislature. It meets in Bern in the Federal Palace.

The Federal Assembly is bicameral — composed of the 200-seat National Council and the 46-seat Council of States. The houses have identical powers. Members of both houses represent the cantons, but, whereas seats in the National Council are distributed in proportion to population, each canton has two seats in the Council of States, except the six 'half-cantons', which have one seat each. Both are elected in full once every four years, with the last election being held in 2019.

The Federal Assembly possesses the federal government's legislative power, along with the separate constitutional right of citizen's initiative. For a law to pass, it must be passed by both houses. The two houses may come together as a United Federal Assembly in certain circumstances, such as to elect the Federal Council (the head of government and state), the Federal Chancellor, the federal judges or (only in times of great national danger) a general.

History 
Prior to the establishment of the federal state in 1848, the only central organ of Switzerland was the Federal Diet (Tagsatzung). Following the Sonderbund War in 1847, the Tagsatzung became responsible for drawing up the Swiss Federal Constitution.

The process of formulating legislative power resulted in clashing opinions, in particular in relation to the representation of the various cantons: the radicals, in the majority in the largest cantons, pushed for a system where representation was purely proportional to the population of each township; the small cantons, for their part, feared being marginalized.  After long debates, a compromise was found by adopting the American model of bicameralism; the parliament will be composed of two chambers with equal power, and the agreement of both will be required to take a decision. The National Council, which represents the people, will comprise representatives from each canton with their distribution being proportional to the population of the cantons, while the Council of States, which represents the cantons, will be composed of the same number of representatives from each canton. According to the Constitution of 1848, the Federal Assembly is "the supreme authority of the Confederation".

The Tagsatzung accepted the draft constitution in June 1848. On September 12, following the vote of the various cantons, it noted that the Constitution had been approved and dissolved itself on September 22, as required by the transitional provisions of the approved text. During the month of October 1848, elections were organized in the cantons in order to elect the deputies. After a few skirmishes, particularly in the canton of Fribourg, the results were announced which confirmed the victory of the radicals, who won more than three-quarters of the seats in the National Council and 30 of the 44 seats in the Council of States. On, November 16 1848, Parliament elected the first Federal Council. In 1874, following the revision of the Constitution and the introduction of extended popular rights, the Federal Assembly became "the supreme authority of the Confederation subject to the rights of the people and the cantons".

The organization of the two councils has changed little over time. When the National Council was created, the total number of seats was 111. This number was not fixed and evolved in proportion to the growth of the Swiss population until 1962 when the definitive number of seats was established at 200; the term of office, meanwhile, was increased from the original 3 years to 4 years in 1931. The mode of election, originally according to the majority system, transitioned to proportional representation in 1918. The Council of States, meanwhile, was not modified until 1979, by adding two new seats for the Canton of Jura which had just been created.

Composition
The Federal Assembly is made up of two chambers:
the National Council, with 200 seats; and
the Council of States, with 46 councillors.

Seats in the National Council are allocated to the cantons proportionally, based on population. In the Council of States, every canton has two seats (except for the former "half-cantons", which have one seat each).

United Federal Assembly
On occasions the two houses sit jointly as the "United Federal Assembly". This is done to:
 elect members of the Federal Council, the Federal Chancellor, the federal judges or (only in times of great national danger) a general 
 arbitrate in the event of conflicts between federal authorities;
 issue pardons; or
 listen to special announcements

The United Federal Assembly is presided by the National Council's presidency.

The Federal Assembly also confirms the appointment of the Federal Data Protection and Information Commissioner (appointed by the Federal Council).

Groups

Parties can cooperate in parliamentary groups, also called political groups, allowing smaller parties access to rights as part of a caucus. At least five members from the same Council are needed to form a group. Only informal groups exist in the Council of States. Members of the National Council are required to be in a formal group in order to be able to sit on a committee.

Since March 2009, there have been six groups in the Federal Assembly.
The latest group to form was the Conservative Democratic Party which split off the Swiss People's Party in 2008.
The Christian Democrats/EPP/glp Group (CEg) was formed after the 2007 elections, out of the former Christian Democratic (C) and EPP (E) groups.
The current FTP/Liberal group (RL) was formed in 2003 out of the former FDP (R) and Liberal (L) groups; since the 2009 fusion of the Free Democrati and Liberal Parties, RL is once again a single-party group. In 2011, the CEg was disbanded, the Green Liberals formed their own parliamentary group (GL) and the three Christian parties formed the Christian-Evangelical Group (CE).

51st legislature (2019–2023) 

Currently (for the legislative period of 2019–2023), the six parliamentary groups are composed as follows:

50th legislature (2015–2019) 
After the 2015 federal election, the Federal Assembly was composed of 7 groups:

See also 
 2019 Swiss federal election
 2015 Swiss federal election
 2011 Swiss federal election
 2007 Swiss federal election
 Hotel Bellevue Palace
 Federal Diet of Switzerland

Notes and references

Bibliography

External links
 Official website
 

 
Government of Switzerland
Switzerland
Switzerland
Switzerland
Politics of Switzerland
1848 establishments in Switzerland